Mbuko is an Afro-Asiatic language spoken in the canton of Doulek, Méri subdivision, department of Diamaré, and also in parts of the canton of Serawa, Tokombéré subdivision, department of Mayo-Sava, in the Far North Region of Cameroon.

The Mbuko (6,700 speakers) traditionally inhabit the Mbuko massif, located east of Meri. They also live in the neighbouring plain of Mayo-Ranéo (in the canton of Doulek, arrondissement of Meri, department of Diamaré, Far North Region).

Notes

References 
 English-Mbuko/French-Mbuko dictionaries on project DAGBO by Jolome
 Richard Gravina.  2001.  "Features of a Chadic Language:  The Case of Mbuko Phonology," Research Mate in African Linguistics: Focus on Cameroon.  Ed. Ngessimo M. Mutaka & Sammy B. Chumbow.  Köln:  Rüdiger Köppe Verlag.  Pages 119-132.

Biu-Mandara languages
Languages of Cameroon